David Rosenboom (born 1947 in Fairfield, Iowa) is a composer-performer, interdisciplinary artist, author, and educator known for his work in American experimental music. 

Rosenboom has explored various forms of music, languages for improvisation, new techniques in scoring for ensembles, multi-disciplinary composition and performance, cross-cultural collaborations, performance art and literature, interactive multi-media, new instrument technologies, generative algorithmic systems, art-science research and philosophy, and extended musical interface with the human nervous system. He is a pioneer in the use of neurofeedback and compositional algorithms. 

He is currently the Roy E. Disney Family Chair in Musical Composition in The Herb Alpert School of Music at California Institute of the Arts, where he served as he dean from 1990 to 2020. He has also taught at other institutions such as Mills College, York University, and the Center for Creative and Performing Arts at the State University of New York in Buffalo. His pre-CalArts students include Jin Hi Kim and Gino Robair. 

As a student, he studied composition, performance, and electronic music at the University of Illinois at Urbana-Champaign with Salvatore Martirano, Lejaren Hiller, Kenneth Gaburo, Gordon Binkerd, Bernard Goodman, Paul Rolland, Jack McKenzie, Soulima Stravinsky, John Garvey, and others. He played the viola on the on the 1968 premier release of Terry Riley's In C. Working with Don Buchla, he was one of the first composers to use a digital synthesizer. He has performed with Trichy Sankaran.

Rosenboom was married to performance artist and vocalist Jacqueline Humbert, and they were divorced in 2012. He married Nicola Voss on December 19, 2014.. He has three children, including Daniel, Dorothea, and Lindsay.

Discography
Suitable For Framing/ Is Art Is/ Patterns for London (A.R.C., 1975)
Collaboration In Performance (1750 Arch, 1978)
A Live Electro-acoustic Retrospective (Slowscan, 1987)
Systems of Judgement (CRC, 1991)
Two Lines (Lovely, 1996) with Anthony Braxton
Brainwave Music (A.R.C., 1976 - EM, 2007)
Future Travel (Street 002, 1981 - New World, 2007)
How Much Better If Plymouth Rock Had Landed On The Pilgrims  (New World, 2009) 
Life Field (Tzadik, 2012)
Naked Curvature (Tzadik, 2015)
 Jacqueline Humbert And David Rosenboom: J.Jasmine: My New Music (Unseen Worlds, 2018)

As sideman
With Anthony Braxton
Five Compositions (Quartet) 1986 (Black Saint, 1986)

See also
Encephalophone

References

Sources
Zorn, John, ed. (2000). Arcana: Musicians on Music. New York: Granary Books/Hips Road. .
Liner notes, David Rosenboom's How Much Better if Plymouth Rock Had Landed on the Pilgrims. New World Records 
The Mike Douglas Show. "Brain Music for John and Yoko: John Lennon, Yoko Ono & Chuck Berry with David Rosenboom." 1972.

Further reading
 Zimmerman, Walter, Desert Plants – Conversations with 23 American Musicians, Berlin: Beginner Press in cooperation with Mode Records, 2020 (originally published in 1976 by A.R.C., Vancouver). The 2020 edition includes a cd featuring the original interview recordings with Larry Austin, Robert Ashley, Jim Burton, John Cage, Philip Corner, Morton Feldman, Philip Glass, Joan La Barbara, Garrett List, Alvin Lucier, John McGuire, Charles Morrow, J.B. Floyd (on Conlon Nancarrow), Pauline Oliveros, Charlemagne Palestine, Ben Johnston (on Harry Partch), Steve Reich, David Rosenboom, Frederic Rzewski, Richard Teitelbaum, James Tenney, Christian Wolff, and La Monte Young.

External links

David Rosenboom at CalArts School of Music

1947 births
Living people
People from Fairfield, Iowa
20th-century classical composers
American male classical composers
American classical composers
21st-century classical composers
Musicians from Iowa
University of Illinois at Urbana–Champaign School of Music alumni
California Institute of the Arts faculty
Mills College faculty
21st-century American composers
Experimental Music Studios alumni
20th-century American composers
20th-century American male musicians
21st-century American male musicians
Centaur Records artists
Tzadik Records artists